Needle's Eye Wilderness is an  wilderness area located approximately  southeast of the town of Globe in Gila County in the U.S. state of Arizona.

Topography
The Mescal Mountains run northwest across the center of Needle's Eye Wilderness. A deep riparian zone covers the narrow river channel, forming the southern boundary of this area. Several small slickrock canyons bisect the Wilderness and connect to the Gila River.

Access
Needle's Eye Wilderness is surrounded by the San Carlos Apache Indian Reservation to the north and south, and private lands to the east and west.  Visitors must obtain permission in advance to access the Wilderness.

See also
 List of Arizona Wilderness Areas
 List of U.S. Wilderness Areas
 Wilderness Act

References

External links
  Needle's Eye Wilderness Area – U.S. Bureau of Land Management
 Needle's Eye Wilderness – Wilderness.net

Protected areas of Gila County, Arizona
IUCN Category Ib
Wilderness areas of Arizona
Bureau of Land Management areas in Arizona
Protected areas established in 1990
1990 establishments in Arizona